The Animal Behavior Society is an international non-profit scientific society that encourages and promotes the professional study of animal behavior. It has open membership and also provides a certification and directory for animal behaviorists. The Society was founded in 1964.

Certification
Unlike the titles veterinarian, psychologist, and psychiatrist, which in the United States are state licensed, the title "animal behaviorist" or similar titles can be used by anyone, regardless of their background. Certified Applied Animal Behaviorists have supervised graduate training in animal behavior, biology, zoology, and psychology (including learning theory) at accredited universities. They publish data based papers in peer-reviewed scientific journals. Some are veterinarians who have completed a residency in animal behavior. They are full-time professionally educated animal behaviorists who work with pet owners to solve behavior issues.

There are two levels of professional certification:
 Associate Applied Animal Behaviorist - Requirements include a Master's degree with an emphasis in animal behavior, a research-based thesis, a minimum of two years of professional experience, and three letters of recommendation from other ABS members
 Certified Applied Animal Behaviorist  Requirements include those of the Associate level, plus a Ph.D. with an emphasis on animal behavior, and additional years of professional experience.

See also
 Ethology
 Animal Behaviour

References

External links
 
 
 

Ethology
Scientific societies based in the United States
Organizations established in 1964